Typhlops capitulatus, commonly known as the Haitian pale-lipped blind snake or Richmond's worm snake, is a species of snake in the family Typhlopidae. The species is endemic to Haiti. There are no subspecies that are recognized as being valid.

Geographic range
In Haiti, T. capitulatus is known from the Tiburon Peninsula.

Habitat

Description
T. capitulatus is small-headed and slender-bodied. Dorsally, it is light brown. Ventrally, it is paler, with scattered white scales. The anal region and the ventral surface of the tail are white.

Reproduction
T. capitulatus is oviparous.

References

Further reading
Hedges SB, Marion AB, Lipp KM, Marin J, Vidal N (2014). "A taxonomic framework for typhlopid snakes from the Caribbean and other regions (Reptilia, Squamata)". Caribbean Herpetology 49: 1-61. (Typhlops capitulatus, p. 47).
Richmond ND (1964). "The Blind Snakes (Typhlops) of Haiti with Descriptions of Three New Species". Breviora (202): 1-12. (Typhlops capitulatus, new species, pp. 2–3, Figure 1).
Schwartz A, Thomas R (1975). A Check-list of West Indian Amphibians and Reptiles. Carnegie Museum of Natural History Special Publication No. 1. Pittsburgh, Pennsylvania: Carnegie Museum of Natural History. 216 pp. ("Typhlops capitulata [sic]", pp. 196–197).

capitulatus
Reptiles described in 1964
Fauna of Haiti